Ambrogio Valadé (June 28, 1937September 14, 2007) was an Italian professional football player. He was a defender for multiple teams, but mostly for the Calcio Foggia team during eight seasons from 1962, until 1970. He retired in 1972. Other teams in which he was part of before Calcio Foggia were Inter Milan, Palermo F.C., and S.P.A.L. He was part of S.S. Maceratese 1922 for one season after Foggia. He played in over 295 matches.

Career
Valadé's first team was Inter Milan, which he joined in 1957. He had his first match when he was 20. He remained in Inter Milan for two more seasons, and in 1959 he joined Palermo F.C. Valadé was only part of Palermo F.C. for one season, and in 1960 he joined S.P.A.L, which he played for two seasons. In 1962 he joined Calcio Foggia, in which he remained for 8 more seasons. Calcio Foggia was also the only team Ambrogio has scored any goal for, the number of goals being 7. Valadé played in approximately 224 matches while he was in Foggia.In 1971, he joined S.S. Maceratese 1922 for one season, and proceeded to retire in 1972. His most usual position was left-back defender.

Personal life
Not much is known about Valadé's personal life. However, it is known he was born in June 28, 1937, in the city of Milan. Throughout his life he lived in Milan, and participated in Italian football teams. He died on September 14, 2007, still in Milan, aged 70, due to unknown reasons. Nothing is known about his family.

References

1937 births
2007 deaths
Italian footballers
Serie A players
Serie B players
Inter Milan players
Palermo F.C. players
S.P.A.L. players
Calcio Foggia 1920 players
Association football defenders
S.S. Maceratese 1922 players